The Metropolitan Opera Auditions of the Air was an annual singing competition sponsored by the Metropolitan Opera of New York City for more than two decades. The competition's purpose was to find, encourage, and promote developing young opera singers with promising future careers. Winners of the competition were given a cash prize and the opportunity to perform opera selections on the radio with the Metropolitan Opera Orchestra.

History
Established in 1935 by newly appointed Met director Edward Johnson, the Metropolitan Opera Auditions of the Air was broadcast live on NBC Radio. Given the number of contestants, the competition was heard through a series of broadcasts that spanned several weeks. Concerned that the competition was becoming merely a tool for promoting singers in NYC, the Met created the Metropolitan Opera National Council Auditions in 1954 as a means of finding and bringing in talented young opera singers from all across the United States. At this point the competition was sometimes referred to as the Metropolitan Opera National Council Auditions of the Air. The first two winners of the competition were the tenor Arthur Carron and the contralto Anna Kaskas; both of which became resident artists at the Met soon after. The competition ceased to operate in 1958, but the Met continues to operate the National Council Auditions.

Notable winners

Marilyn Cotlow
Annamary Dickey
Thomas Hayward
Christine Johnson
Frank Guarrera
Mack Harrell
William Hargrave
Margaret Harshaw
Lansing Hatfield
Lois Hunt
Anna Kaskas
Arthur Kent
Robert Merrill
Patrice Munsel
Regina Resnik
Eleanor Steber
Maxine Stellman
Hugh Roderick Thompson
Leonard Warren

References

Metropolitan Opera